Dennis Thompson may refer to:
Dennis Thompson (drummer) (born 1948), drummer with the MC5
Dennis Thompson (footballer) (1925–1986), English footballer who played for Sheffield United and Southend United
Dennis F. Thompson (born 1940), political scientist and professor at Harvard University